Pleurotus euosmus, also known as tarragon oyster mushroom, is a species of edible fungus in the genus Pleurotus, It is quite similar to the better-known Pleurotus ostreatus,  but it is distinguished by its strong smell reminiscent of tarragon and substantially larger spores.

Description

General 

 The cap grows from 5 to about 15 cm, with beige-tan to dingy-brown surface. It's first convex, becoming plane and then depressed with age.
 The stem is short, sometimes absent, may be forked and can vary from excentric to fairly central.  Each stem may be up to about 12 cm long and up to 2 cm thick.
 The dingy gills are decurrent down the stem and broad.
 The spore print is pale pinkish-lilac.

Microscopic characteristics 

 The spores in the form of an rather elongated ellipsoid are around 12-14 µm by 4-5 µm.

Distribution, habitat & ecology 
This mushroom is saprobic on dead wood and can also be a weak parasite. It occurs stumps and fallen trunks, preferring elms. It is fairly rare, limited to the British Isles, reported only in England and Scotland.

Similar species 
Pleurotus euosmus is quite similar to the well-known food mushroom Pleurotus ostreatus, to the point of Watling & Gregory having considered P. euosmus a variety of P. ostreatus. However, later phylogenetic research has shown it is more closely related to Pleurotus citrinopileatus and Pleurotus cornucopiae, belonging to their intersterility group in P. djamor-cornucopiae clade.

Human impact 
This mushroom is edible and it can be cultivated in a manner similar to P. ostreatus. It is cultivated by individual hobbyists, but not cultivated on a wide/commercial scale.

References 

Fungal tree pathogens and diseases
Pleurotaceae
Edible fungi
Fungi of the United Kingdom